Prescribed daily dose (PDD) is the usual dose of medication calculated by looking at a group of prescriptions for the medication in question. At times the PDD needs to be related to the condition being treated.

See also

References

Pharmacy